Cosmopterix aurella is a moth in the family Cosmopterigidae. It was described by John David Bradley in 1959. It is found on Rennell Island in the Solomon Islands.

References

Arctiidae genus list at Butterflies and Moths of the World of the Natural History Museum

Moths described in 1959
aurella